The Little Red Caboose is a children's book by Marian Potter and illustrated by Tibor Gergely, first published by Little Golden Book in 1953. Hardcover book contains 24 pages.

Plot
It tells the story of a caboose who longs to be as popular as the steam engine at the front of the train, and gains the respect and admiration of all when it saves the train from rolling down a steep hill.

Book sources

References 

1953 children's books
Children's fiction books
Children's books about rail transport
Little Golden Books
American picture books
Simon & Schuster books